This is the year-to-year membership and makeup of the Premier Basketball League, including league divisional alignment and the circumstances of teams no longer in the league.

Alignments

2008

2009

2010

2011

*The Frost Heaves folded partway through the 2011 season.

2012

Defunct Teams/Failed Expansion
Arkansas Impact (2008)
Augusta Groove (2008-09)
Bridgeport, Connecticut
Buffalo Dragons (2008-10) - sold to the management of the Buffalo Sharks of the ABA to form the Buffalo Stampede.
Chicago Aztecas
Chicago Throwbacks (2008-09)
Dallas Defenders (2008) - ownership revoked mid-season, replaced by league-run replacement, folded when no outside owner could be found
Detroit Panthers (2008-09) 
Jacksonville JAM - expelled by league
Jacksonville SLAM (2008) - league-run replacement for JAM; folded when no outside owner could be found 
 Lawton-Fort Sill Cavalry-(2009-11) left after losing in the controversial 2011 PBL Finals.  Suspended operations.
Mid-Michigan Destroyers (2009)
Montreal Sasquatch (2009)
Pee Dee Vipers (2014)
Philadelphia Flight (2014)
Quad City Riverhawks (2007-08)
Reading Railers (2007-08)
Rockford Fury (2007-08) - folded when the PBL instituted a "one team per owner" rule 
Southeast Asian All-Stars - announced by PBL, have not been heard from since and not on official website's team roster.
Toronto Lazers - PBL announced a Toronto expansion team but the team did not join the league for the 2009 season. No update from the league on their status.
Vermont Frost Heaves (2009-11) - folded from lack of funds.

Teams that left the PBL for another league
 Battle Creek Knights - rejoined International Basketball League
 Bluegrass Stallions- left under unspecified circumstances.
 Buffalo Stampede - removed by the league for failure to adhere to operating standards, joined Atlantic Coast Professional Basketball League
 Capitanes de Arecibo - rejoined Baloncesto Superior Nacional
 Dayton Air Strikers-(2011-12) joined International Basketball League, returned to PBL for 2012 season 
 Halifax Rainmen (2009-11) - left after controversial 2011 playoffs for National Basketball League of Canada.
 Lafayette Legends - announced, never played a PBL game. Joined Independent Basketball Association (also never played).
 Maryland GreenHawks (2007-09) - joined Atlantic Coast Professional Basketball League as Washington GreenHawks, folded.
 Minnesota Ripknees (2007) - returned to American Basketball Association, folded shortly afterward.
 Quebec Kebs (2009-11) - left after controversial 2011 playoffs for National Basketball League of Canada
 Racine Storm (2014-16) - played three games in 2016 before leaving PBL; ceasing operations
 Saint John Mill Rats (2009-11) - left after controversial 2011 playoffs for National Basketball League of Canada

Timeline

References

Premier Basketball League